Pristimantis is a very large genus of frogs distributed in the southern Caribbean islands (Lesser Antilles) and in Central and South America from Honduras to northern Argentina and southern Brazil. With 596 described species (as of October 2022), the genus had more species than any other genus of vertebrate animals. Many of these species genus are endemic to the Northwestern Andean montane forests ecoregion in north-western South America.

Etymology
From the greek πριστις, serrated and μαντις, arboreal frog.

Taxonomy
Placement of this genus has varied greatly. Pristimantis was long included in the massive genus Eleutherodactylus, and considered part of the family Leptodactylidae. Currently, the genus is placed placing in the family Strabomantidae, subfamily Strabomantinae,

Species 

As of October 2022, there are 592 species, but new ones continue to be described on a regular basis (e.g.):

Notes

References
 P.J.R. Kok, Means, D.B., & Bossuyt, F. (2011). "A new highland species of Pristimantis Jimenez de la Espada, 1871 (Anura: Strabomantidae) from the Pantepui region, northern South America." Zootaxa 2934: 1–19.
 T. Orrell. (custodian) (2012). ITIS Global: The Integrated Taxonomic Information System (version April 2011). In: Species 2000 & ITIS Catalogue of Life, 25 June 2012 (Bisby F., Roskov Y., Culham A., Orrell T., Nicolson D., Paglinawan L., Bailly N., Kirk P., Bourgoin T., Baillargeon G., eds). Digital resource at www.catalogueoflife.org/col/. Species 2000: Reading, UK.

 
Strabomantidae
Amphibian genera
Amphibians of South America
Amphibians of Central America
Amphibians described in 1870
Taxa named by Marcos Jiménez de la Espada